Barbara Simons (born 16 June 1929) is a retired German politician from the Social Democratic Party. She was a Member of the European Parliament from 1984 to 1994.

References

See also 

 List of members of the European Parliament for West Germany, 1984–1989

Living people
1929 births
MEPs for Germany 1984–1989
MEPs for Germany 1989–1994
20th-century German women politicians
20th-century women MEPs for Germany
Social Democratic Party of Germany MEPs